Christmas in Romania is a major annual celebration, celebrated on 24/25 of December, as in most countries of the Christian world. The observance of Christmas was introduced once with the Christianization of Romania but public observance was discouraged during the Communist period (1948—1989). In the post-communist Romania, Christmas started being celebrated again more festively.

The Christmas and holiday season starts officially on December 6, on Saint Nicholas 's day and ends on January 7, with the celebration of Saint John. Other major holidays in this period are Great Union Day, Saint Nicholas' Day, Saint Ignatius' Day, Christmas Eve ( in Romanian), Christmas Day ( in Romanian), Saint Stephen's day, New Year's Eve ( in Romanian), and the Epiphany.

Advent

The seven-week Advent season in anticipation of Jesus Christ's birth is obligatory for all Eastern Christian Romanians. It starts on November 14 yearly and ends up on Christmas Day. November 14, the first day of advent is traditionally called Lăsata secului (literally the day the abstinence begins). Any kind of products obtained from animal sources are prohibited. Also, on Wednesdays and on Fridays, oil among other products is not to be eaten. Some special days (for example Saint Ignatius Day or Great Union Day) occur during the period when Christians are allowed to eat fish or dairy. The Christmas Eve should be a day of total abstinence to thank God for sending The Savior. All said, there are forty days of advent (seven to nine of them being exceptions), this being the second abstinence period as length during the Romanian religious year, after the Easter advent.

During this season, the Christmas holiday season in Romania starts with Saint Andrew's feast day on December 6. Customs say everyone should hang plenty of garlic and a crucifix next to all doors and windows on the mansion, to keep evil spirits, geani, and spells away from their home. Strigoi or vampires (such as geani) may appear during the night between November 29 and November 30 as this night is popularly known as Noaptea lupului (Night of the wolf).

The next day, December 1, is the Great Union Day (Ziua Marii Uniri), the National Day of Romania. It is celebrated by all Romanians. In Bucharest and Alba Iulia Romanian Armed Forces have parades, showing their Land and Air vehicles and performing the Romanian national anthem "Deșteaptă-te, române!", used for the Union back in 1918. People are given free mititei and fasole cu cârnați while they party into the night. Free music concerts and street festivals are organised annually in every Romanian city. There are also numerous Television specials, most notably ones broadcast by Pro TV, which bring famous or important Romanians into the spotlight. The day usually ends with fireworks.

At the beginning of December, the Christmas lights are turned on all over the streets. The same night, Moş Nicolae comes and gives children presents. Children receive their gifts early in the morning of December 6 or late at night on December 5; traditionally, the gifts are put in their laced up boots. Children are usually given sweets or books; if they have been naughty, they get wooden sticks.

On December 20, Saint Ignatius Day, Romanians start the last preparations for Christmas. On this date, they cut pigs for the Christmas Eve supper. Around this date, people usually buy their Christmas trees from public markets or supermarkets.

On December 24, it is Noaptea de ajun, the day children usually start caroling their neighbors. On the same date, women bake traditional cookies to give children for their caroling. By that time, the Christmas tree must usually be already decorated.

Christmas music

Music is an important part of Christmas celebration all over Romania. There is a special genre of music, related to Christmas carols but with more traditional / Christian lyrics. These are named colindă. Although the text of all colinde is concerned with the events of the Nativity, certain elements of the folk rituals performed around Christmas are probably pre-Christian in origin, having their roots in the Roman Saturnalia and pagan rituals related to the winter solstice and soil fertility. Colinde are performed in all parts of Romania (including Moldova), with regional variations in terms of the number of participants, the exact timing of different melodies and lyrics.

In traditional Romanian rural society, preparations for colinde started well in advance (sometimes weeks) before Christmas. The village youth (usually boys) would begin to form groups in different places and designate a leader to practice singing in unison. These groups are called cete de colindători, and their numbers vary from region to region.

Then, starting on Christmas Eve, the groups would go to different houses and begin singing. In some villages, they go first to the mayor's house, followed by the teacher's house, whereas in other parts there is no pre-established order. The families would then invite them into the house and give them different small gifts such as nuts, dried fruits, and pretzels. There are also adaptations from international hit carols into Romanian, for example "Noapte de vis" (from "Silent Night") or "O, brad frumos!" (from "O Tannenbaum").

Examples of colinde with religious subject are "Astăzi s-a născut Hristos" (Today Christ Was Born), "O, ce veste minunată!" (Oh, What Wonderful News!), " Trei păstori" (Three Shepherds), " Trei crai de la rărărit", " Steaua" (The Star) or " Sus la poarta Raiului" (Up at Heaven's Gate). The first two ones talk about the Nativity of Jesus. The first one indicates people to pray for Jesus and thank him for being born while the other one informs us how Christ was born and praises Mary. The other ones tell the stories of the Three shepherds, Three Magi and of the Christmas star. The latter one, "Sus la poarta Raiului" is a portrait of the Manger during Jesus' nativity.

Apart from the religious songs, there are also many other original colinde about subjects like Joy, Prosperity or Caroling itself. For example "Moş Crăciun cu plete dalbe" (White-Haired Santa Claus), "Colindiţa", "Pluguşorul" or "Scoală gazdă" (Awaken, Host). The first one talks us about Moş Crăciun (literary Old Father Christmas, who is in fact Santa Claus) and his act of bringing nice children presents on Christmas day. The third and fourth ones are about specific Romanian customs to provide and maintain health or prosperity. They count some reasons for Caroling. The last one tells the story of a family where the mother wasn't able to cook colăcuț (special Christmas pastry). They ask the host to whom they perform the colind to give them a colăcuț, claiming their mother didn't have the tools and ingredients to make it. As we can figure out, the song was originally performed after New Year, as they claim that "When the oven started working, the New Year had already arrived! "

Many folklore musicians covered, re-mastered or did renditions to those songs, some of them being well-known artists such as Maria Tănase. Beyond traditional music, mainstream artists have also involved themselves in Christmas culture. One example is Madrigal choir who covered over 20 carols. Ştefan Hruşcă is another Christmas music alumni who kicks off Christmas nationwide tours in late November yearly. He had also covered hundreds of songs and put them on at least three Christmas albums. Rock & Roll singer-songwriter and actor Ştefan Bănică, Jr. has a now-traditional concert series to honor Christmas, ever since 2002. They are called Împreună de Crăciun / Concert extraordinar de Craciun and take place at Sala Palatului in Bucharest. He also released a Christmas album including the top ten smash hit "Doar o dată e Crăciunul" (Christmas Is Only Once).

Singer Paula Seling also has two Christmas compilations — "Colinde şi cântece sfinte" (out 1998), "Albumul de Craciun" (out 2002), "De Sărbători" (out 2006) and more lately "A mai trecut un an" (Another Year Over) (out 2010). She released three music videos to promote the albums for the songs "O, ce veste minunată!", "Trei păstori" and "A mai trecut un an".

R&B singer Andra also released a Christmas album in 2007, entitled "Vis de iarnă" (Winter Dream). The title single benefited from a music video in which Andra is traveling home to gather with her family for Christmas. Singer Elena Gheorghe also covered the song "Silent Night, and alongside band Mandinga released a Christmas album "De Craciun".

Pop music duo André also released a Christmas EP in late 2000. It is entitled "Noapte de Vis" and it contains both Christmas-related song and other songs. The title single is also known as "Moşule, ce tânăr eşti!" (How you are, Santa!) was described more as a dance-pop club hit than as a Christmas song even peaking at number-one on the Romanian Top 100.

In late 2009, Bănică, Jr starred in a Christmas movie — "Ho, Ho, Ho!". Its soundtrack was released the same year and it featured Christmas-related songs, including a Top 100 single "Ho, Ho, Ho!". It was released under MediaPro Music. Label fellow Horia Brenciu also had some Christmas hits in the Airplay Chart, for example, "Noapte de Crăciun". Also in 2009, worldwide house sensation Inna released an A Side / B side digital single containing a cover of "O, ce veste minunată!" and an original recording, "I Need You for Christmas". The latter one became the only Romanian Christmas songs to break the borders as it entered the Russian Airplay Chart and the UK Singles Chart as well as the Romanian Top 100. In 2011 LaLa Band premiered a Christmas album on December 1.

A lot of compilations have been released for Christmas in Romania, for example, the "I Need You for Christmas" series. Radio station Magic FM only broadcasts Christmas songs exclusively from December 5 to January 5 starting 2008. They name themselves "Santa Claus' Radio Station".

Starting in 2010, a special Airplay Chart started being shown yearly - Holiday Airplay Chart. Moreover, as a result to season's conjunction, Mariah Carey scored four entries the same week in December 2010 on the Romanian Top 100 with "Silent Night", "Santa Claus Is Coming to Town", "All I Want for Christmas Is You" and "Oh Santa!" all charted simultaneously (the record was previously held by Michael Jackson after his death in 2009 but it was once again broken in 2011 by Rihanna (with five entries). Christmas albums are also record-breakers. In 2010 Carey's album "Merry Christmas II You" broke all records by selling over 10,000 albums in one week. The record was then broken by Lady Gaga's "Born This Way" just to be broken once again by another Christmas album in 2011 when Justin Bieber's "Under the Mistletoe" sold over 12,000 units in one week. It was later on broken by yet another Christmas album by Michael Bublé simply entitled "Christmas" album that sold over 15,000 copies in a singular week. By now it is one of this year's biggest-selling albums with over 30,000 units sold in less than a month and a half.

Christmas food 

During Christmas, Romanians bake or buy various special dishes, including desserts and sweets. Romanians most usually bake Cozonac (spongecake), a kind of Panetone made of flour, yolks, yeast and many other ingredients, flavors, condiments and additions. There are several types of spongecakes, with hundreds of recipes. You can either knead it for hours to be ready in 6 hours, or you can let it rise for 1 hour to avoid kneading it. You can fill the sponge cake with walnuts, cocoa, raisins, Turkish delight and in Transylvania: poppy seed paste (cozonac cu mac). Plates heaped with small pastries and cakes (corni și baclava) are prepared to serve to carollers when they call.

A molded vegetable and chicken salad held together with mayonnaise and decorated with olives and boiled eggs are often prepared. It is called Salată de boeuf from the French, although it usually does not contain beef.

Other Christmas dishes include piftie, sarmale, and pork dishes.

See also
Christmas worldwide
Public holidays in Romania

References

 
Romania
Eastern Orthodox liturgical days